Makaranka is a Belarusian surname derived from the given name Makar. Notable people with the surname include:

Aliaksandr Makaranka (born 1990), Belarusian weightlifter
Viachaslau Makaranka (born 1975), Belarusian sport wrestler

See also
 
 Makarenko, Ukrainian

Belarusian-language surnames